István Lang (born 14 January 1933) is a Hungarian cyclist. He competed in four events at the 1952 Summer Olympics.

References

External links
 

1933 births
Living people
Hungarian male cyclists
Olympic cyclists of Hungary
Cyclists at the 1952 Summer Olympics
People from Baja, Hungary
Sportspeople from Bács-Kiskun County